Le Moine is a mountain of the Pennine Alps, situated east of Bourg Saint Pierre in the canton of Valais, Switzerland. It is located on the ridge Les Maisons Blanches in the Grand Combin massif.

References

External links
 Le Moine on Hikr

Mountains of the Alps
Alpine three-thousanders
Mountains of Valais
Mountains of Switzerland